The 1872 Canadian federal election was held from July 20 to October 12, 1872, to elect members  of the House of Commons of Canada of the 2nd Parliament of Canada.  Prime Minister Sir John A. Macdonald's Conservative Party remained in power, defeating the Liberals. However, the Liberals increased their parliamentary representation considerably, while the Conservative seat count remained static, giving them only six more seats than the Liberals. The election produced the country's first minority government. The support of two independent Conservative MPs functionally gave Macdonald an extremely slim majority that allowed it to survive for two years, until it fell due to scandal.

Edward Blake, who had a seat in both the House of Commons of Canada and the Ontario legislature, resigned as Premier of Ontario in order to run in the 1872 federal election as dual mandates had been abolished. Had the Liberals won the election, he likely would have been offered the position of Prime Minister of Canada. The party had no formal leader as such until 1873 when Alexander Mackenzie was given the title after Blake declined due to ill health. Blake was ill during much of the 1872 campaign, and it was Mackenzie who essentially led the Liberal campaign in Ontario, though not outside the province.

The 1872 general election was the first to include the new provinces of Manitoba and British Columbia, which had both joined Canada after the Confederation of 1867.  By-elections had been held in both provinces to elect Members of Parliament in the newly created ridings, with Manitoba receiving four seats and British Columbia six. (In 1870 Canada had also expanded to include the current provinces of Alberta, Saskatchewan and the Territories, but no MPs were elected there until 1887.) In 1873, PEI joined Confederation and six more seats were added to the House of Commons, all filled by acclamations in by-elections.

Electoral System
Most of the ridings in this election elected just one member through First past the post, but two ridings, Ottawa and Halifax, elected two members, with each voter casting up to two votes (Plurality block voting).

Results

National

Note:
1 Though identifying themselves as Liberal-Conservatives, these MPs and those identifying as Conservatives were both led by Sir John A. Macdonald (himself a Liberal-Conservative) and sat together in the House of Commons.

Acclamations

The following MPs were acclaimed:
 British Columbia: 3 Liberal-Conservatives
 Manitoba: 1 Liberal-Conservative
 Ontario: 3 Conservatives, 3 Liberal-Conservatives, 10 Liberals
 Quebec: 9 Conservatives, 5 Liberal-Conservatives, 5 Liberals
 New Brunswick: 6 Liberals, 1 Independent
 Nova Scotia: 1 Conservative, 4 Liberal-Conservatives, 2 Liberals

Results by province

See also

 List of Canadian federal general elections

Notes

References 

Federal
1872
July 1872 events
August 1872 events
September 1872 events
October 1872 events